Nicoya may refer to:
 Places
 Nicoya, a district in Nicoya canton in Costa Rica
 Nicoya, a canton in Guanacaste Province, Costa Rica
 Partido de Nicoya, an historical administrative unit annexed to Costa Rica

 Geological features
 Nicoya Peninsula
 Nicoya Gulf

 Culture
 Nicoya culture - Pre-Columbian culture of Costa Rica and Nicaragua

 Organisms
 Nicoya (crab), a genus of crabs